Three ships of the Royal Navy have borne the name HMS Crusader, after the participants in the Medieval Crusades:

 was a  destroyer launched in 1909 and sold in 1920.
 was a C-class destroyer launched in 1931.  She was transferred to the Royal Canadian Navy in 1938 and renamed .  She was sunk in 1942.
 was a destroyer of another . She was launched in 1944, transferred to the Royal Canadian Navy in 1945 and sold in 1964.

Royal Navy ship names